Matviyenko, sometimes transliterated Matviienko, Matvijenko, or Matvienko, is a patronymic surname of Ukrainian origin. It is derived from the first name Matviy, equivalent to English Matthew.

It may refer to:
 Anatoliy Matviyenko (1953–2020), Ukrainian politician
 Antonina Matviyenko (born 1981), Ukrainian singer
 Danylo Matviienko (born 1990), Ukrainian baritone
 Dmitri Matviyenko (born 1989), Russian footballer
 Dmytro Matviyenko (born 1992), Ukrainian-Russian footballer
 Igor Matvienko (born 1960), Russian musician
 Ihor Matviyenko (born 1971), Ukrainian sailor
 Mykola Matviyenko (born 1996), Ukrainian footballer
 Nina Matviienko (born 1947), Ukrainian singer
 Lisa Matviyenko (born 1997), Ukrainian-born German tennis player
 Sergey Matviyenko (born 1972), Kazakhstani wrestler
 Valentina Matviyenko (born 1949), Russian politician
 Viktor Matviyenko (1948–2018), Ukrainian football coach and player
 Vladislav Matviyenko (born 1967), Russian football coach and player
 Yaroslav Matviyenko (born 1998), Russian footballer

See also
 
 

Ukrainian-language surnames
Patronymic surnames
Surnames from given names